Uhligia is a genus of Lower Cretaceous (Barremian) ancylocerid ammonoid cephalopods initially found in Germany.

Uhligia, named by Koenen, 1904, has the general form characteristic of heteromorph ancyloceratids. The early part is more or less straight, then sharply bent, followed by a second straight shaft and a final hook. Ribs are fine, weak, and irregular, lacking tubercles; slanted in the early part, straight in the later. Uhligia differs from genera like Ancyloceras and Aspinoceras in lacking the open coil in the early stage.

References

 Arkell, et al., 1957. Mesozoic Ammonoidea. Treatise on Invertebrate Paleontology, Part L. (Ammonoidea). Geol Soc of America and Univ Kansas Press. p. L211.

Ammonites of Europe
Ancyloceratoidea
Ammonitida genera
Cretaceous ammonites